Turbonilla lozoueti is a species of sea snail, a marine gastropod mollusk in the family Pyramidellidae, the pyrams and their allies.

Distribution
This marine species occurs off West Africa (Abidjan, Côte d'Ivoire)

References

External links
 To Encyclopedia of Life
 To World Register of Marine Species

lozoueti
Gastropods described in 2002